Leroro is a village in Thaba Chweu Local Municipality of Mpumalanga province, South Africa.

References

Populated places in the Thaba Chweu Local Municipality